Cylindrocopturinus pictus is one of 39 genres of true weevil in the beetle family Curculionidae. It is found in North America, Central America, and the Caribbean.

References

Further reading 

 

Curculionidae
Articles created by Qbugbot
Beetles described in 1908